Stirling is a Scottish name that originated in Stirlingshire, Scotland. Since prior to the Norman conquest the family held its seat in Stirling, Scotland.

People with the surname include:
Sir Alexander Stirling (1927–2014), British ambassador
Andy Stirling (born 1961), Professor of science and technology policy at Sussex University, England
A. M. W. Stirling (1865–1965), British author 
Archie Stirling (born 1941), Laird of the Keir estate, Scotland
Bob Stirling (1919–1991), English rugby union international
Sir Charles Stirling (1760–1833), vice-admiral in the Royal Navy
David Stirling (architect) (1822–1887), Canadian architect
Sir David Stirling (1915–1990), British Army officer, founder of the Special Air Service
M. David Stirling (born 1940), American politician, lawyer, and author
Edward Stirling (playwright) (1809–1894), English adaptor of novels to the stage
Edward Stirling (politician) (1804–1873), MLC in South Australia, father of Sir Edward
Sir Edward Charles Stirling (1848–1919), South Australian anthropologist
Frederick Stirling (1829–1885), Royal Navy admiral
Geoff Stirling (born 1921), Canadian businessman
Gilbert de Stirling, early 13th-century bishop of Aberdeen, Scotland
Grote Stirling (1875–1953), Canadian politician
Harold Stirling (1904–1968), politician in Victoria, Australia
Harriet Stirling (1878–1943), South Australian philanthropist, daughter of Sir Edward
Hugh de Stirling, 13th-century bishop-elect of Dunkeld, Scotland
Hugh Stirling (1907–1994), Canadian football player
Iain Stirling (born 1988), Scottish comedian and Television presenter
Ian Stirling (biologist), Canadian zoologist and marine biologist
Ian Stirling (broadcaster) (1940–2005), British actor and television presenter
James Stirling (disambiguation), several people, including
James Stirling (mathematician) (1692–1770), Scottish mathematician
Sir James Stirling, 1st Baronet (c.1740–1805), Scottish banker and lord provost of Edinburgh
Sir James Stirling (Royal Navy officer) (1791–1865), British admiral and Governor of Western Australia
James Stirling (engineer, born 1799) (1799–1876), Scottish engineer
James Hutchison Stirling (1820–1909), Scottish philosopher
James Stirling (engineer, born 1835) (1835–1917), Scottish locomotive engineer
Sir James Stirling (judge) (1836–1916), British jurist
James Stirling (botanist) (1852–1909), Australian botanist and geologist
James Stirling (1890s footballer) (fl. 1895–1896), Scottish footballer
Jimmy Stirling (1925–2006), Scottish footballer
Sir James Stirling (architect) (1926–1992), architect
Sir James Stirling of Garden (born 1930), British Army officer, chartered surveyor and Lord Lieutenant of Stirling and Falkirk
James Stirling (physicist) (1953–2018), British physicist and Provost of Imperial College London
Jan Stirling (born 1955), Australian basketball player and coach
Jane Stirling (1804–1859), Scottish amateur pianist, student and friend of Frédéric Chopin
Jered Stirling (born 1976), Scottish footballer
John Stirling (disambiguation), several people
Ken Stirling, New Zealand former professional rugby league footballer, coach and administrator
Kenneth Stirling (1935–1973), South Australian ecologist and philanthropist
Sir Lancelot Stirling (1849–1932), Australian politician and grazier
Linda Stirling (1921–1997), American showgirl, model and actress
Lindsey Stirling (born 1986), American violinist, dancer, performance artist, and composer.
Magdalene Stirling (1765–1846), Scottish composer
Matthew Stirling (railway engineer) (1856–1931), Locomotive Superintendent of the Hull and Barnsley Railway
Matthew Stirling (1896–1975), American ethnologist and archaeologist
Pamela Stirling, New Zealand journalist and editor
Patrick Stirling (railway engineer) (1820–1895), Chief Mechanical Engineer of the Great Northern Railway
Patrick Stirling (born 1862) (1862−1925), English footballer and Mayor of Doncaster
Paul Stirling (born 1990), Irish international cricketer
Rachael Stirling (born 1977), English actress
Radha Stirling, British-Indian activist and lawyer
Richard Stirling, British writer and actor
Robert Stirling (1790–1878), Scottish clergyman, inventor of the Stirling engine
Rosemary Stirling (born 1947), New Zealand-born Scottish athlete
Scotty Stirling (1928/1929–2015), American sports executive and sportswriter
Stephen Stirling (disambiguation), several people
S. M. Stirling (born 1953), American science fiction author
Syd Stirling (born 1951), Australian former politician
Waite Stirling (1829–1923), English missionary, first Bishop of the Falkland Islands
Sir William Stirling-Maxwell, 9th Baronet (1818–1878), Scottish historical writer, art historian, politician and virtuoso
William Stirling (physiologist) (1851–1932), Scottish professor of physiology
William Stirling (British Army officer) (1907–1973), British general
Yates Stirling (1843–1929), US Navy rear admiral
Yates Stirling, Jr. (1872–1948), US Navy rear admiral

See also
Sterling (surname)

References

Scottish toponymic surnames